The 1972–73 season was the 49th season in the existence of AEK Athens F.C. and the 14th consecutive season in the top flight of Greek football. They competed in the Alpha Ethniki, the Greek Cup and the UEFA Cup. The season began on 13 September 1972 and finished on 3 June 1973.

Overview

The declining course of AEK Athens continued during the period 1972–73. Important players such as Petros Ravousis, Tasos Konstantinou and Dionysis Tsamis were acquired. On the other hand, the arrival of dubious value of Latin American footballers, according to the current of the time, such as Néstor Errea, Rodolfo Vicente and Hugo Zeer did not offer anything special to the problematic AEK. As a result, the club finished 5th, at a distance of 23 points from the top. The counterproductive attack of AEK in contrast to their long tradition in this section, was remarkable, as they scored only 39 goals while conceding 36.

AEK participated in the UEFA Cup for the first time in their history. In the first round, they were drawn against the Hungarian Salgótarján. It was characteristic, that the two matches against AEK constitute the whole of the European presence in Salgótarján's history. In the first leg at Nea Filadelfeia, AEK prevailed easily with 3–1. The rematch in Hungary had acquired a purely procedural character and the "yellow-blacks" qualified with a 1–1 draw. In the second round, luck completely turned its back on AEK, bringing them against the great Liverpool of Bill Shankly. The first match on Anfield, Liverpool's unquestionable superiority was certified, as the "reds" took the victory with 3–0 and largely ensured the qualification for the next round. In the rematch of AEK Stadium, Liverpool finished the job with a 3–1 win, which sent them to the next round and in the conquest of the title, at the end of the season.

For another year AEK stayed away from claiming the Greek Cup. In the First Round, AEK eliminated Korinthos at home and in the Round of 32, they overcame Ethnikos Asteras, with an impressive 9–0 home win. At the Round of 16, AEK were drawn against the second division club Apollon Kalamarias and were eliminated with a 2–1 defeat at Kalamaria.

Players

Squad information

NOTE: The players are the ones that have been announced by the AEK Athens' press release. No edits should be made unless a player arrival or exit is announced. Updated 30 June 1973, 23:59 UTC+2.

Transfers

In

 a.  and Dimitris Palasidis as exchange.

Out

Renewals

Overall transfer activity

Expenditure:  ₯2,300,000

Income:  ₯0

Net Total:  ₯2,300,000

Pre-season and friendlies

Alpha Ethniki

League table

Results summary

Results by Matchday

Fixtures

Greek Cup

Matches

UEFA Cup

First round

Second round

Statistics

Squad statistics

! colspan="11" style="background:#FFDE00; text-align:center" | Goalkeepers
|-

! colspan="11" style="background:#FFDE00; color:black; text-align:center;"| Defenders
|-

! colspan="11" style="background:#FFDE00; color:black; text-align:center;"| Midfielders
|-

! colspan="11" style="background:#FFDE00; color:black; text-align:center;"| Forwards
|-

|}

Disciplinary record

|-
! colspan="17" style="background:#FFDE00; text-align:center" | Goalkeepers

|-
! colspan="17" style="background:#FFDE00; color:black; text-align:center;"| Defenders

|-
! colspan="17" style="background:#FFDE00; color:black; text-align:center;"| Midfielders

|-
! colspan="17" style="background:#FFDE00; color:black; text-align:center;"| Forwards

|}

References

External links
AEK Athens F.C. Official Website

AEK Athens F.C. seasons
AEK Athens